The 15105 / 15106 Chhapra Junction–Nautanwa Intercity Express is an Express  train belonging to Indian Railways North Eastern Railway zone that runs between  and  in India.

It operates as train number 15105 from Chhapra Junction to Nautanwa and as train number 15106 in the reverse direction, serving the states of  Bihar & Uttar Pradesh.

Coaches
The 15105 / 15106 Chhapra Junction–Nautanwa Intercity Express has 10 general unreserved & 2 SLR (seating with luggage rake) coaches . It does not carry a pantry car.

As is customary with most train services in India, coach composition may be amended at the discretion of Indian Railways depending on demand.

Service

Routing

Traction
As the route is electrified, a  based WDM-3A diesel locomotive pulls the train to its destination.

References

External links
15105 Intercity Express at India Rail Info
15106 Intercity Express at India Rail Info

Intercity Express (Indian Railways) trains
Transport in Chhapra
Rail transport in Bihar
Rail transport in Uttar Pradesh
Maharajganj district